"The Jeopardy Room" is episode 149 of the American television anthology series The Twilight Zone, which originally aired on April 17, 1964, on CBS. It is one of the few Twilight Zone episodes to feature no supernatural or sci-fi elements.

Opening narration

Plot
Major Ivan Kuchenko, an escaped political prisoner who is attempting to defect, is trapped inside a hotel room in an unnamed, politically neutral country. Commissar Vassiloff, a hitman, and Boris, his assistant, are watching Kuchenko from a room across the street. Vassiloff, who considers himself an artist, has an elaborate plan for Kuchenko's assassination. After Vassiloff tricks Kuchenko into drinking a sleeping drug, Kuchenko awakes to find a taped recording from Vassiloff in which he explains that he has booby-trapped an object in the room. If Kuchenko finds and disarms the object within three hours, he will be allowed to live; if he tries to leave the room before then or turn out the lights, he will be shot by Boris, an expert sniper.

Vassiloff tells Boris he has hidden a lethal bomb in the telephone, but it will be triggered only by picking up an incoming call. Thus, when Kuchenko picks up the phone without it ringing, nothing happens. Kuchenko grows increasingly nervous and desperate as the ordeal continues, even begging Vassiloff to shoot him at one point. With ten minutes of time left, Vassiloff places a call to Kuchenko's room. Kuchenko puts his hand on the receiver, but hesitates. When Vassiloff tries to call him a second time, Kuchenko bolts out of the hotel room, narrowly escaping a spray of bullets from Boris. Later, Vassiloff and Boris enter the room to dispose of evidence. The telephone rings, and Boris and Vassiloff are both killed after Boris unthinkingly answers it. On the other end of the line is Ivan Kuchenko, calling from a phone booth at the airport. The operator tells him she is unable to reach his party, but Kuchenko states, "It’s alright, operator. I... I have reached them.” He then leaves to board a plane flying to New York City, as Vassiloff and Boris are shown lying dead amidst the rubble of Kuchenko's room.

Closing narration

Cast
Martin Landau as Major Ivan Kuchenko
John Van Dreelan as Commissar Vassiloff
Bob Kelljan (credited Robert Kelljan) as Boris
Rod Serling as Narrator/himself

Trivia
John Van Dreelan, in real life, had been a political prisoner of the Nazis before escaping from a concentration camp in World War II.

See also
Payback, a 1999 film that features a similar booby trap as a plot device and a similar twist ending.

References
DeVoe, Bill. (2008). Trivia from The Twilight Zone. Albany, GA: Bear Manor Media. 
Grams, Martin. (2008). The Twilight Zone: Unlocking the Door to a Television Classic. Churchville, MD: OTR Publishing. 
Zicree, Marc Scott: The Twilight Zone Companion. Sillman-James Press, 1982 (second edition)

External links

1964 American television episodes
The Twilight Zone (1959 TV series season 5) episodes
Television episodes written by Rod Serling